Kim Song-gun (born 1945) is a North Korean painter. He works at the Mansudae Art Studio in Pyongyang.

Work 

Kim Song-gun is also called "Painter of the Waves" since he mostly paints sea and river sceneries with thunderous waters. Despite a very realistic depiction the paintings carry a subtle kind of modern abstraction achieved through the dramatic presentation of the waves.
One of those paintings, Waves of the Sea Kumgang, was noticed internationally due to a photo from Bill Clinton's state visit to North Korea in 2009 showing him sitting next to Kim Jong-il with the large green waves painting in the background.

Awards 
 1999: People's Prize for Waves of the Sea Kumgang

Notes

External links 
 Ingeborg Ruthe: "Mein Bild Der Woche: Parabeln auf Nordkoreanisch", Berliner Zeitung, 28 August 2012 (in German)
 "Hae Kumgang" and exhibition report on artdaily.org
 Why Dictators Love Kitch?

1945 births
Living people
North Korean painters
Contemporary painters
Postmodern artists
People from Pyongyang
20th-century North Korean male artists 
21st-century North Korean male artists